Neoorthocaulis is a genus of liverworts belonging to the family Anastrophyllaceae.

The species of this genus are found in Northern Hemisphere.

Species:
 Neoorthocaulis attenuatus (Mart.) L.Söderstr., De Roo & Hedd. 
 Neoorthocaulis binsteadii (Kaal.) L.Söderstr., De Roo & Hedd.

References

Jungermanniales
Jungermanniales genera